Maws may be:
 the plural of maw
 a surname
 Tony Maws, American chef

MAWS is the Missile approach warning system.

See also 
 Mawes (disambiguation)
 Maus (disambiguation)